Nahur is a north-eastern suburb of Mumbai and it lies between Mulund and Bhandup. Nahur railway station is on the Central Railway line of the Mumbai Suburban Railway,opened in 2006. 

Suburbs of Mumbai